The Dothioraceae are a family of fungi in the order Dothideales. Species in this family have a widespread distribution, and are biotrophic or necrotrophic, usually associated with woody plants.

Genera
Aureobasidium
Botryochora (placement uncertain)
Delphinella
Dothiora
Endodothiora
Hortaea
Jaffuela (placement uncertain)
Plowrightia
Saccothecium
Sydowia  - 11 spp.
Yoshinagaia

References

Dothideales
Ascomycota families
Taxa named by Ferdinand Theissen
Taxa named by Hans Sydow
Taxa described in 1917